Sapphire is a 1959 British crime drama film. It focuses on racism in London toward immigrants from the West Indies, and explores the "underlying insecurities and fears of ordinary people" about those of another race. The film was directed by Basil Dearden, and stars Nigel Patrick, Earl Cameron and Yvonne Mitchell. It received the BAFTA Award for Best Film and screenwriter Janet Green won a 1960 Edgar Award from the Mystery Writers of America for Best Foreign Film Screenplay. It was considered a progressive film for its time.

Earl Cameron, who plays the part of Sapphire's brother, also appears in Flame in the Streets (1961), another British film dealing with racial issues.

Plot
Some children playing on Hampstead Heath in London come across the body of a young light-skinned woman who has been stabbed to death. Police Superintendent Robert Hazard (Nigel Patrick) and his assistant, Inspector Phil Learoyd (Michael Craig), follow the lead of the woman's handkerchief, monogrammed with an "S," and eventually discover that her name was Sapphire Robbins (Yvonne Buckingham), a music student.  Her brother (Earl Cameron), a doctor working in Birmingham, is notified. Her fiance, an architecture student named David Harris (Paul Massie), claims to have been in Cambridge at the time of the murder.

An autopsy reveals that Sapphire had been three months pregnant. The police are surprised when Dr. Robbins arrives, and they learn that he is black. He and his sister were mixed race, but Sapphire was able to "pass" as white.  Robbins is professional in his bearing and proud, sceptical that the police will actually try to solve his sister's murder.

Investigating Sapphire's life and acquaintances, the officers find that she frequented nightclubs with black clienteles, leading them to look for another possible boyfriend. Learoyd is quick to jump to racist assumptions about the victim's behaviour, but Hazard is nonjudgemental and sometimes counters his assistant's biased views. Interviews with other possible witnesses or connections to the case reveal a range of racist attitudes in the white population.

When the officers question members of David's family they learn that Sapphire had revealed her family background to David, and had informed his parents and adult sister Mildred (Yvonne Mitchell) about the pregnancy. David's father (Bernard Miles) had reluctantly agreed to David and Sapphire marrying despite his own racist views, and the family's concern about their social standing, as well as the knowledge that David would probably have to forfeit a scholarship to study in Rome.

Visiting the Tulip Club, a nightclub favoured by affluent young blacks, Hazard and Learoyd learn that Sapphire was resented by some of her contemporaries, but that she often went there with a young man named Johnnie Fiddle (Harry Baird).  After a chase Johnnie is caught and brought in by the police.  A knife and a bloody shirt are discovered in his room, but Johnnie claims that these were from a fight he had with another man at the Tulip Club, Horace Big Cigar (Robert Adams). In the meantime, however, David is seen acting suspiciously near the murder scene on Hampstead Heath and it is discovered that he had returned from Cambridge earlier than he claimed on the day of the murder.

Hoping to prod further revelations from those closest to the murder, Hazard brings Dr Robbins to the Harrises' home, prompting angry reactions from the family. The most violent reaction comes from David's sister Mildred, who responds with disgust when Robbins picks up one of her daughter's toys. Mildred finally confesses to her hatred of Sapphire and to the murder. With the case wrapped up Hazard acknowledges the larger social evils underlying the case, telling Learoyd that they, "didn't solve anything ... We just picked up the pieces."

Cast
Nigel Patrick as Superintendent Robert Hazard
Yvonne Mitchell as Mildred Farr
Michael Craig as Inspector Phil Learoyd
Paul Massie as David Harris
Bernard Miles as Ted Harris
Olga Lindo as Mrs Harris
Earl Cameron as Dr Robbins
Gordon Heath as Paul Slade
Jocelyn Britton as Patsy
Harry Baird as Johnnie Fiddle
Orlando Martins as Barman
Rupert Davies as PC Jack Ferris
Freda Bamford as Sergeant Cook
Robert Adams as Horace Big Cigar
Yvonne Buckingham as Sapphire Robbins
Vanda Hudson as Blonde Girl at Tulip's Club (uncredited) 
Philip Lowrie as Student (uncredited)
Boscoe Holder as Dancer in Nightclub (uncredited)
Basil Dignam as Dr Burgess (uncredited)
Fenella Fielding as Lingerie Shop Manageress (uncredited)
Lloyd Reckord as Pianist in the International Club (uncredited)
Peter Vaughan as Detective Whitehead (uncredited)
Victor Brooks as Police Sergeant (uncredited)
Desmond Llewelyn as Policeman (uncredited)
Barbara Steele as Student in café (uncredited)
Dolores Mantez as Student at the International Club (uncredited)
Richard Vernon as Detective on Hampstead Heath (uncredited)

Reception

Critical reception
Nina Hibbin, writing about the film on its initial UK release in the Daily Worker, commented: "You can't fight the colour bar merely by telling people it exists. You have to attack it, with passion and conviction. Commit yourself up to the hilt. Otherwise you're in danger of fanning the flames."

At the time of the film's US release, The New York Times reviewer A.H. Weiler wrote that while it is "not entirely in a class by itself, the combination of murder mystery and racial issues puts it several interesting cuts above standard movie melodrama".

The reviewer for the British Film Institute's Screenonline website writes: "Dearden is not immune to prevailing prejudices, equating a young woman living alone in London with promiscuity, and seeing an enthusiasm for jazz as evidence of dubious character. The film is littered with casual, unchallenged racism".

Box office
According to Kinematograph Weekly the film performed "better than average" at the British box office in 1959. The film reportedly made a profit of over £100,000 by 1961.

Paperback novelisation
In April 1959, Panther Books of London issued a screenplay novelisation by prolific mystery and thriller novelist E.G. Cousins.

References

External links
 
 
 A. H. Weiler, "The Screen: 'Sapphire'; British Crime Story Opens at Sutton" (review), The New York Times, 3 November 1959.

1959 films
1959 crime drama films
1950s mystery drama films
British crime drama films
British mystery drama films
Best British Film BAFTA Award winners
Edgar Award-winning works
Films about racism in the United Kingdom
Films directed by Basil Dearden
Films set in London
Films shot at Pinewood Studios
Racism in the United Kingdom
1950s English-language films
1950s British films
Cultural depictions of Metropolitan Police officers